Global Proficiency Certificate (GPC) - is an international program of standardization, which included many of the major educational, cultural and community organizations United States, Britain, France, Germany, Japan and other countries in the world, involving staff, students, undergrad, members of the organizations - participants in the process of confirming their competence to the international proficiency standards. Among the participants of the International Federation of Actors, the World Intellectual Property Organization, the International Theatre Institute. All professionals who have been retrained and verify compliance with a single international professional standards receive a certificate of global expertise of the International sample logo program. This allows you to create a single international data bank of skilled workers and a uniform system of evaluating staff.

Global confirm qualification program gives participants a competitive advantage to search for internships and employment in large number and variety of employers, including global corporations, national representation abroad, educational, cultural and international educational institutions, international non-governmental organizations.

Global workforce